Wiktor Lampart (born 21 May 2001) is an international speedway rider from Poland.

Speedway career 
Lampart became the European Junior Champion after winning the 2019 Individual Speedway Junior European Championship. He had previously won the silver medal in 2018.

In 2021, he won the gold medal at the Team Junior World Championship with Jakub Miśkowiak. In 2022, he finished in 4th place during the World Under-21 Championship in the 2022 SGP2. Also in 2022, he helped Lublin win the 2022 Ekstraliga.

References 

Living people
2001 births
Polish speedway riders